The Silver Wraith was the first post-war Rolls-Royce. It was made from 1946 to 1958 as only a chassis at the company's Crewe factory, its former Merlin engine plant, alongside the shorter Bentley Mark VI. The Bentley was also available as a chassis for coachbuilders, but for the first time could be bought with a Rolls-Royce built Standard Steel body.

It was announced by Rolls-Royce in April 1946 as the 25/30 hp replacement for the 1939 Wraith in what had been their 20 hp and 20/25 hp market sector, that is to say Rolls-Royce's smaller car. The size was chosen to be in keeping with the mood of post-war austerity. Even very limited production of the chassis of the larger car, the Phantom IV, was not resumed until 1950 and then, officially, only for Heads of State.

Improvements announced were: chromium-plated cylinder bores for the engine; a new more rigid chassis frame to go with new independent front suspension; and a new synchromesh gearbox. Chassis lubrication was now centralised.

Engine
The straight six-cylinder postwar engine, which had been briefly made for the aborted by war Bentley Mark V, replaced conventional overhead valve gear with an F-head configuration of overhead inlet valves and side exhaust valves and reshaped combustion chambers. There were new main and big-end bearings and a more efficient drive to the timing gear. To this prewar mix Rolls-Royce added chromed bores.

Chassis

The first cars had an entirely new 127 inch (3226 mm) wheelbase chassis which differed considerably from that of the pre-war Wraith and was much nearer rigid. It matched the new Bentley chassis but with an extra 7 inch section added to the centre. The new chassis had coil sprung independent front suspension, which required a very rigid chassis to function properly, and at the rear conventional semi-elliptic springs and live axle. The braking system was a hydro-mechanical hybrid of hydraulic fronts and mechanical rears using the mechanical servo similar to that of the pre-war cars.

The last short-wheelbase cars were delivered in November 1953. The long, 133 inch (3378 mm), wheelbase chassis was announced in 1951 and the first delivered in January 1952. 639 were made by the time of the last deliveries in October 1958.

This was not quite the last Rolls-Royce model to be supplied as a rolling chassis ready for a wide variety of bespoke coachwork designed and made by a rapidly declining number of specialist coachbuilders.   Most of the bodies selected used "formal" limousine designs.

From 1949 until 1955 customers wishing to buy a Rolls-Royce fitted with a much smaller standard steel body could purchase the Silver Dawn. It rode on a chassis seven inches shorter than the Silver Wraith, and was almost identical to Rolls-Royce's Bentley Standard Steel saloon available alongside the Silver Wraith since July 1946.

Automatic transmission
Initially only a four-speed manual gearbox was offered, but this was supplemented by a General Motors Hydramatic automatic option from 1952.

Official uses
Irish Presidential State Car – 1947–present
Brazilian Presidential Ceremonial State Car – 1952–present
President of Zimbabwe's Ceremonial State Car - 1952–present
Royal Dutch State Limousine – 1958
Royal Danish Ceremonial Car "Store Krone" (Great Crown) – 1958
 Royal Greek Ceremonial Car (Silver Wraith Hooper version) – 1959
 2 Australian Ceremonial Cars for Royal Tour (Silver Wraith All-weather tourer by Hooper) – 1959
 Chief Minister of Penang Island,Federal Territory of Malaysia. Previously owned by Sir Henry Gurney, British High Commissioner of Malaya Before being ambushed by communist forces during the Malayan Emergency. – circa 1951

Film appearances

Witness for the Prosecution (1957)
Indiscreet (1958)
Let's Make Love (1960)
Victim (1961)
From Russia with Love (1963)
The Love Bug (1968)
The Return of the Pink Panther (1975)
Stardust Memories (1980)
Arthur (1981)
Withnail and I (1987)
The Karate Kid, Part III (1989)
Batman (1989)
Batman Returns (1992)
The Odd Couple II" (1998)James Dean (2001)The Scapegoat (2012)Spectre'' (2015)

Gallery

State cars

References

External links

Rolls-Royce Silver Wraith, book by Martin Bennett
Pictures, information and specs @ Conceptcarz.com
Pictures, information, history and specs

Silver Wraith
Cars introduced in 1946
1950s cars
Road transport of heads of state
Rear-wheel-drive vehicles
Full-size vehicles
Luxury vehicles
Sedans